John M. Perkins (born June 16, 1930) is an American Christian minister, civil rights activist, Bible teacher, best-selling author, philosopher and community developer. He is the founder and President Emeritus of the John & Vera Mae Perkins Foundation with his wife, Vera Mae Perkins (also known as "Grandma Perkins"). He is co-founder of the Christian Community Development Association (CCDA). Despite being a third-grade dropout, Perkins has been recognized for his work with 17 honorary doctorate degrees from schools including Belhaven University, Virginia University of Lynchburg, Wheaton College, Gordon College, Taylor University, Northern Seminary and Millsaps College. He has served on the Boards of Directors of World Vision and Prison Fellowship. Perkins has advised and/or served on the Presidential Task Forces of five U.S. Presidents. He is the author of 17 books, including the best-selling One Blood: Parting Words to the Church on Race. For more information on Perkins' Manifesto and Master Class go to johnmperkins.com

Early life
John M. Perkins was born in 1930 in New Hebron, Mississippi. His mother died of pellagra when he was just seven months old. Abandoned by his father, he was raised by his grandmother and extended family, who worked as sharecroppers.  In 1947, he moved away from Mississippi at the urging of his family, who worried that he might be in danger following the fatal shooting of his brother, Clyde, by a police officer. He settled in southern California. In June 1951, Perkins married Vera Mae Buckley; earlier that year, he had been drafted into the U.S. Armed Forces. Perkins served in Okinawa during the Korean War. In 1957, Perkins's son, Spencer, invited him to church and Perkins converted to Christianity.

Career
In 1960, Perkins moved with his wife and children from California to Mendenhall, Mississippi, which neighbors his childhood hometown of New Hebron. There, in 1964, he established Voice of Calvary Bible Institute.

Motivated by a desire to help their neighbors as well as their own children, Vera Mae started running a day-care center from their home that from 1966 to 1968 became part of the federally funded Head Start Program.  Initially concerned solely with evangelism and Bible literacy, Perkins had a growing conviction that the gospel of Jesus Christ addressed spiritual and physical needs.

In 1965, Perkins supported voter registration efforts in Simpson County, and in 1967 he became involved in school desegregation when he enrolled his son Spencer in the previously all-white Mendenhall High School.

In the fall of 1969, Perkins became the leader in an economic boycott of white-owned stores in Mendenhall. On February 7, 1970, following the arrest of students who had taken part in a protest march in Mendenhall, Perkins was arrested and tortured by white police officers in Brandon Jail.

Remarkably, Perkins emerged from this terrible experience with a commitment to his vision of a holistic ministry — one that saw the bondage racism inflicted on whites as well as the damage and deprivation of the black community. He summarized his philosophy of Christian ministry in the "three Rs" — relocation, redistribution and reconciliation. He expounded on this philosophy in the 1976 book A Quiet Revolution: The Christian response to human need, a strategy for today.

By the mid-seventies, Voice of Calvary, Jackson and Mendenhall Ministries were operating thrift stores, health clinics, a housing cooperative, and classes in Bible and theology. Perkins was in demand as a speaker in evangelical churches, colleges, and conventions across the country.

In 1982, the Perkinses left Voice of Calvary Ministries to return to California, where they founded Harambee Christian Family Center, now called Harambee Ministries, in northwest Pasadena.

In 1989, Perkins founded the Christian Community Development Association (CCDA), a network of evangelical congregations and organizations working in deprived urban settings. CCDA sought to invite evangelicals into social justice and civil rights.

After the death of his son Spencer in 1998, Perkins established the Spencer Perkins Center, the youth arm of the John M. Perkins Foundation. It has developed youth programs such as After School Tutoring, Summer Arts Camp, Junior and College Internship Program, Good News Bible Club, Young Life and Jubilee Youth Garden. The foundation also has a housing arm, Zechariah 8, providing affordable housing for low-to-moderate-income families, with a focus on single mothers.

On September 17, 2016, Perkins became President Emeritus of the John & Vera Mae Perkins Foundation as his three daughters, Elizabeth, Priscilla, and Deborah Perkins, became co-presidents of the organization.

Recognition
In 2012, Calvin College began the John M. Perkins Leadership Fellows, a cohort of students who address issues like poverty, injustice, racism and materialism, and strive to be servant leaders who are committed to the renewal and restoration of their communities.

In 2004, Seattle Pacific University opened the John Perkins Center for Reconciliation, Leadership Training, and Community Development.

In 2009, the band Switchfoot released the song "The Sound (John M. Perkins' Blues)". It includes the line "John Perkins said it right / Love is the final fight."

Honorary Doctorates 

 Belhaven University
 Covenant College
 Geneva College
 Gordon College
 Huntington University
 King University
 Millsaps College
 North Park University
 Northern Seminary
 Nyack College
 Seattle Pacific University
 Spring Arbor University
 Taylor University
 Virginia University of Lynchburg
 Wheaton College
 Whitworth University
 Wesley Biblical Seminary

John M. Perkins Fellows & Legacy Programs 

 Calvin University
 Indiana Wesley Theological Seminary
 Jackson State University
 Moody Bible Institute
 New Orleans Baptist Theological Seminary
 Northern Seminary
 Seattle Pacific University
 University of Virginia, Charlottesville
 Wake Forest School of Divinity

Awards 

 1972 Ford Foundation Fellow
 1978-1980 Distinguished Black American
 1980 Mississippi Religious Leadership Man of the Year
 1980 Who's Who of International Intellectuals
 1980 John W. Dixon Outstanding Community Service Award
 1984 Black Business Association of Pasadena/Altadena Humanitarian of the Year
 1986 NAACP's Ruby McKnight Williams Award
 1988 American Biographical Institute
 1988 Personalities of America, 4th ed., Richmond Barthè Historical Society
 2005 Mighty Men of Valor Lifetime Achievement Award
 2008 Jordon Lifetime Achievement Award, Evangelical Christian Publishers Association
 2010 Mississippi Medal of Service Award
 2016 Beautiful are the Feet Award, Samuel Dewitt Proctor Conference
 2016 Spirit of Healing Award, Los Angeles Christian Health Centers
 2017 Game Changer Agent Award, The Forge for Families, Houston, TX
 2017 For My People Award, Jackson State University
 2017 The Gospel Coalition Book Awards Finalist
 2018 Brooks Hays Award, Second Baptist Church, Little Rock, AR
 2019 Living Legend Award, New Hope Baptist Church, Jackson, MS
 2019 Chuck Colson Conviction & Courage Award, Biola University
 2019 Abraham Kuyper Prize, Calvin College
 2019 Emma Elzy Award, The United Methodist Church, MS
 2019 John & Vera Mae Perkins Co-Laborer with Christ Award, Indiana Wesley Seminary
 2020 World Magazine's Daniel of the Year

Books
Let Justice Roll Down. Regal Books, 1976 .
A Quiet Revolution: The Christian Response to Human Need, a Strategy for Today. Word Books, 1976. .
With Justice for All. Regal Books, 1982 .
Beyond Charity: The Call to Christian Community Development. Baker Books, 1993. .
He's My Brother: Former Racial Foes Offer Strategy for Reconciliation. Baker Books, 1994. .
Resurrecting Hope. Regal, 1995. .
Restoring At-Risk Communities: Doing It Together and Doing It Right. Baker Books, 1996 .
Linking Arms, Linking Lives: How Urban-Suburban Partnerships Can Transform Communities. Baker Books, 2008. .
Follow Me to Freedom: Leading as an Ordinary Radical. Regal Books, 2009. .
 Welcoming Justice: God's Movement Toward Beloved Community. Intervarsity Press, 2009. .
Leadership Revolution: Developing the Vision & Practice of Freedom & Justice. Regal, 2012. 
Making Neighborhoods Whole: A Handbook for Christian Community Development. Intervarsity Press, 2013 .
Dream with Me: Race, Love, and the Struggle We Must Win. Baker Books, 2017. .
One Blood: Parting Words to the Church on Race. Moody Publishers, 2018. .
He Calls Me Friend: The Healing Power of Friendship in a Lonely World. Moody Publishers, 2019. .
Count It All Joy: The Ridiculous Paradox of Suffering. Moody Publishers, 2021. .
Go and Do: Nine Axioms on Peacemaking and Transformation From the Life of John Perkins, 2022. .

References

Further reading
 Mobilizing for the Common Good: The Lived Theology of John M. Perkins, eds. Peter Slade, Charles Marsh, and Peter Heltzel (Jackson, MS: University Press of Mississippi, 2013). 
 Charles Marsh, "Unfinished Business: John Perkins and the Radical Roots of Faith-Based Community Building", in The Beloved Community: How Faith Shapes Social Justice, from the Civil Rights Movement to Today, ''(New York: Baker Books, 2005) 153-188.

External links
 The John Perkins Center at Seattle Pacific University
 John Perkins, The Civil Rights Movement as Theological Drama, The Project on Lived Theology, University of Virginia
 John M. Perkins Papers, Billy Graham Center Archives, Wheaton College. 
 https://johnmperkins.com/ John M. Perkins Master Class & Manifesto, Moody Publishers, Chicago, Illinois

Living people
American civil rights activists
1930 births
Christian radicals
People from Lawrence County, Mississippi
People from Mendenhall, Mississippi